Dillapiole is an organic chemical compound and essential oil commonly extracted from dill weed, though it can be found in a variety of other plants such as fennel root. This compound is closely related to apiole, having a methoxy group positioned differently on the benzene ring. Dillapiole works synergically with certain insecticides like pyrethrins similarly to piperonyl butoxide, which likely results from inhibition of the MFO enzyme of insects.

No carcinogenicity was detected with parsley apiol or dill apiol in mice.

References

See also 
 Apiole
 Phenylpropene

Phenylpropenes
O-methylated phenylpropanoids
Benzodioxoles
Allyl compounds
Pyrogallol ethers
Hydroxyquinol ethers